The LG KC910 Renoir is a high-end feature phone released by LG Electronics. The LG Renoir was the world's first full touchscreen 8-megapixel camera phone. It debuted on 2 October 2008 as the successor of the LG Viewty. Like the Viewty is incorporates xenon flash with Schneider Kreuznach optics.

The LG Renoir adds several new capabilities over the Viewty, including GPS support, Wi-Fi support, an accelerometer, and Dolby Mobile audio support.

See also
Samsung i8510 Innov8
Sony Ericsson C905
Nokia N82

References

KC910
Mobile phones introduced in 2008